The University of Queensland Law Journal is a leading Australian double-blind peer-reviewed law review. It was established in 1948 and is published three times a year. The editor-in-chief is James Allan.

External links 
 

Biannual journals
English-language journals
Publications established in 1948
Australian law journals
University of Queensland academic journals